João Miguel Traquina André (born 29 August 1988), known as Traquina, is a Portuguese professional footballer who plays for S.C. Covilhã as a forward.

Club career
Born in Alcobaça, Leiria District, Traquina finished his youth career with Académica de Coimbra. He played lower league football until the age of 25, with G.D. Tourizense (two spells), F.C. Pampilhosa, Sertanense FC, AD Fafe, Associação Naval 1º de Maio and Sertanense FC. He was part of G.D. Estoril Praia's Segunda Liga roster in the first part of the 2009–10 season, but failed to appear for the club.

In May 2014, Traquina signed for S.C. Covilhã in the second division. He made his debut in the competition on 9 August, playing the full 90 minutes in a 1–1 away draw against Portimonense SC.

Traquina joined Primeira Liga club C.F. Os Belenenses on 29 May 2015, with the deal being made effective on 1 July. He played his first match in the competition on 15 August, as a second-half substitute for Abel Camará in the 3–3 home draw with Rio Ave FC. After only nine competitive appearances, he finished the campaign on loan to Covilhã.

Traquina returned to the second tier in the summer of 2016, going on to spend several seasons with Académica.

References

External links

1988 births
Living people
People from Alcobaça, Portugal
Sportspeople from Leiria District
Portuguese footballers
Association football forwards
Primeira Liga players
Liga Portugal 2 players
Segunda Divisão players
Associação Académica de Coimbra – O.A.F. players
G.D. Tourizense players
G.D. Estoril Praia players
FC Pampilhosa players
Sertanense F.C. players
AD Fafe players
Associação Naval 1º de Maio players
S.C. Covilhã players
C.F. Os Belenenses players
C.D. Trofense players
Portugal youth international footballers